Frank Neville Patterson Jr. (March 11, 1917 – July 31, 1971) was a North Carolina politician who served in both houses of the North Carolina General Assembly.

A graduate of the University of North Carolina School of Law, Patterson, a Democrat, was an attorney and local judge in Stanly County. He was elected to one term in the North Carolina House of Representatives in 1958 and later to two terms in the North Carolina Senate in 1968 and 1970. He was elected Senate President Pro Tempore in 1971 but his tenure was short-lived, as he died later that year. Senators selected Gordon P. Allen to succeed him as Senate leader.

References
North Carolina Manual of 1971, p. 650

Democratic Party members of the North Carolina House of Representatives
Democratic Party North Carolina state senators
1917 births
1971 deaths
University of North Carolina School of Law alumni
People from Stanly County, North Carolina
Place of birth missing
20th-century American politicians